Paul Simmons may refer to:

Paul Allen Simmons (1921–2014), U.S. federal judge
Paul Simmons (drummer), American drummer (Th' Legendary Shack Shakers, The Reverend Horton Heat, Petra)
Paul Simmons (football coach), American football coach

See also
Paul Simons (disambiguation)
Paul Symmons (born 1973), Australian rules footballer